Nancy Brickhouse, M.A, PhD (24 October 1960) is an American academic currently serving as provost at Baylor University. Prior to that, she was provost at Saint Louis University.

She holds a B.A in chemistry from Baylor University, and also holds a M.S in Purdue University, she earned her PhD from Purdue University. Brickhouse started her career in some rural district schools in north east Texas teaching physics, physical science and chemistry prior to her M.S and academy doctor degree.

She worked in the University of Delaware for 27 years before being Saint Louis University provost. At Delaware, she held many leadership roles, including interim provost, deputy dean of the College of Education and Human Development. She was also a part of the task force that established the first set of science standards in the University of Delaware.

In 2018, she resigned as provost of Saint Louis University, returning to the school's education department. In February 2019, she was announced as the incoming provost of Baylor University, and stepped into the role on May first of that same year.

Notes 

Living people
1960 births
Baylor University people
Saint Louis University people
People from Waco, Texas
Baylor University alumni
Purdue University alumni